Pfäffikon ZH is a railway station in the Swiss canton of Zurich (ZH) and municipality of Pfäffikon. The station is located on the Effretikon to Hinwil railway line.

The station should not be confused with Pfäffikon SZ railway station, which is in Pfäffikon, canton of Schwyz.

Service 
Pfäffikon ZH is an intermediate stop on Zurich S-Bahn service S3. During peak periods it also serves as the eastern terminus of S-Bahn service S19. During weekends, there is also a nighttime S-Bahn service (SN8) offered by ZVV. Summary of all S-Bahn services:

 Zürich S-Bahn:
 : half-hourly service during peak hours to Koblenz via .
 Nighttime S-Bahn (only during weekends):
 : hourly service to  via .

References

External links 
 

Railway stations in the canton of Zürich
Swiss Federal Railways stations
Pfäffikon, Zürich